Jessica Harris (born 1981) is an English actress.

Background 
Jessica Harris was born in Halifax, West Yorkshire, England to Miles and Jo Harris. She grew up in the nearby towns of Hebden Bridge and Heptonstall, and attended Calder High School in Mytholmroyd. She graduated from the Calderdale College in Halifax with a National Diploma in Performing Arts. She later attended the Arts Educational School in London on a scholarship.

Career 
Harris made her television debut in the late 1980s when she appeared in the children's educational series How We Used to Live, produced by Yorkshire Television. She later appeared in other Yorkshire series, such as Heartbeat.

She has had other major television roles in Linda Green (as Katy Green), Burn It (as Kelly) and Thieves Like Us (as Mel). On stage, she has appeared in Bottle Universe (October–November 2005, Bush Theatre), Wuthering Heights (York Theatre Royal, June 2007) and The Pornographer Diaries (Edinburgh, August 2007). In 2009, she played Desdemona in a national tour of Othello, opposite Lenny Henry. Her performance in Othello was praised by Kate Kellaway of The Observer, who described her as "charming".

Harris has appeared in the ITV police drama The Bill three times. She first appeared in 2002 as Karen Best, the sister of cast regular PC Gary Best. The role was a recurring one and she appeared in a number of episodes for a year. She next appeared in 2007 as an inmate who has an affair with a prison officer. Harris's most recent role in the series came in 2009 when she appeared as Cathy Menal, a sister of murder victim.

Television

Theatre

References

External links 

1981 births
English stage actresses
English television actresses
People from Halifax, West Yorkshire
Living people